Walter Cecil Owen (September 26, 1868April 15, 1934) was an American jurist and Republican politician.  He served the last 16 years of his life on the Wisconsin Supreme Court (1918–1934) and was the 21st Attorney General of Wisconsin (1913–1918).  Earlier, he served six years in the Wisconsin State Senate, representing Pierce and St. Croix counties.

Biography

Born in Trenton, Pierce County, Wisconsin, Owen received his law degree from the University of Wisconsin. He served in the Wisconsin State Senate and was Wisconsin Attorney General for three terms. In 1918, Owen was appointed to the Wisconsin Supreme Court, serving until his death.

He died in St. Petersburg, Florida, on April 15, 1934.

References

External links
 

People from Pierce County, Wisconsin
University of Wisconsin–Madison alumni
University of Wisconsin Law School alumni
Wisconsin state senators
Wisconsin Attorneys General
Justices of the Wisconsin Supreme Court
1868 births
1934 deaths